Nana Nebieridze (born 21 June 1975) is a Georgian diver. She competed in the women's 10 metre platform event at the 2000 Summer Olympics.

References

1975 births
Living people
Female divers from Georgia (country)
Olympic divers of Georgia (country)
Divers at the 2000 Summer Olympics
Place of birth missing (living people)